The Last Resort is a Hardy Boys and Nancy Drew Supermystery crossover novel published in 1989.

The Hardy Boys and Nancy Drew are called in to join a team of young detectives guarding Mount Mirage, a Colorado ski lodge that houses billionaires, playboys, and celebrities. A talented music artist is pronounced dead in his suite, and the trio suspect foul play. The gang encounter a concerned lodge owner, a rock "legend" producing a music video on the estate, an attractive country singer, and a murderer bent on destroying everyone at any cost.

In another plot twist Frank Hardy and Nancy Drew find themselves stranded in an abandoned cabin. After spending time alone together, they kiss; however, once they get rescued, they both feel it was a mistake.

References

Supermystery
1990 American novels
1990 children's books
Novels set in Colorado